"COMINT" is the fifth episode of the first season of the period drama television series The Americans. It originally aired on FX in the United States on February 27, 2013.

Plot
Elizabeth Jennings (Keri Russell), posing as a security company inspector, goes to the home of Adam Dorwin (Michael Countryman),  an anti-ballistics program contractor who has recently lost his wife. Elizabeth asks if he had received communications from foreign agents, and he assures her he hadn't even told his wife about his job. Dorwin is revealed to be a KGB agent, whom Elizabeth was subtly prompting to call his handler. After she leaves, Dorwin proceeds to call his handler, Vasili Nikolaevich (Peter Von Berg) from the Soviet embassy. Dorwin says that he is losing it and Vasili says that they will meet soon. The FBI hears that Dorwin may be ready to spy for them, as he is becoming uneasy.

Elizabeth meets Claudia (Margo Martindale) and tells her that, if pressed harder, Dorwin would have told her everything. Claudia tells her that Dorwin had sent four signals for a meet in the last week, but no meet took place because FBI surveillance teams are using new encryption on their radios, so Russian agents can't tell when they're being followed. Claudia then tells Elizabeth about an agent she ran in West Germany – a loner whom she befriended. One day, they didn't need him any more, so he killed himself.

Stan Beeman (Noah Emmerich) convinces Nina (Annet Mahendru) to find out what is going on with Dorwin. Nina performs fellatio on Vasili for information. He tells her that Dorwin simply has the "jitters". Stan is hurt when Nina tells him how she got Vasili to talk. Elizabeth finds and seduces the FBI contractor of the encryption cards hidden in the trunks of FBI vehicles. He begins to beat her with his belt and Elizabeth, pretending to be scared, begs him to stop. When Philip (Matthew Rhys) sees the marks on her back, he is furious and tells Elizabeth that he'll deal with the contractor. Elizabeth is insulted, stating: "If I wanted to deal with him, you don't think he'd be dealt with?"

On their mission, Philip and Elizabeth argue in the car about the FBI contractor.  Elizabeth confirms that FBI agents are tailing them two cars behind. Philip brakes suddenly, causing the FBI vehicle to rear-end an elderly woman's car in between them. The FBI agents go to a garage to get their car repaired, while Philip pretends to need repairs on his vehicle. His car is placed on an adjacent lift. While both cars are on lifts and Philip is distracting the mechanic and FBI agents below the cars, Elizabeth, hiding in the trunk of Philip's car, gets out and, out of view, climbs into the FBI agents' trunk. She finds the encryption card she needs, but is unable to leave as the car has been fixed. She is driven in the trunk to the FBI headquarters, but escapes and meets Philip outside.

Stan is at home learning Russian by tape when his wife, Sandra (Susan Misner), tries to bring him to bed, but he declines. She reminds him of happier times, but he declines again and continues to listen to the tape. The next day, Nina, in Vasili's office giving him oral sex under his desk, overhears Arkady Ivanovich (Lev Gorn) tell Vasili that they have the encryption codes. Vasili tells him to organize a meet for the next day with Dorwin. Nina tells Stan this and the FBI has the codes changed.

Hearing static, Arkady tells Vasili that the FBI must have changed the codes and that Dorwin may be leading him into a trap. Vasili goes anyway, leading the FBI to follow him. At the same time, Dorwin is in another location. He is shot in the head and killed by Elizabeth. Philip meets Claudia, who tells him that there is a mole working for the FBI.

Production
The episode was written by Melissa James Gibson and directed by Holly Dale.

Reception
In its original American broadcast on February 27, 2013, "COMINT" was watched by 1.44 million viewers, according to Nielsen ratings.

References

External links
 

The Americans (season 1) episodes
2013 American television episodes